Crazy Diamond is a 1993 triple-CD boxed set of Syd Barrett's two 1970 albums The Madcap Laughs and Barrett, and Opel, an out-takes compilation from 1988. All discs are further augmented by various alternate takes.

"Our main plan was to find Syd's acoustic takes, before the other musicians were drafted in to overdub them. But we stumbled across some fascinating material that sheds new light on Syd's working methods." — Phil Smee

Design and release
The box set is packaged in a 6 x 12-inch longbox, and also contains a 24-page booklet.

Simultaneously with this release, EMI reissued The Madcap Laughs, Barrett and Opel separately as well, along with the new bonus tracks of alternate takes.

Two unreleased Syd Barrett songs with Pink Floyd, "Scream Thy Last Scream" and "Vegetable Man" were remixed by Malcolm Jones, and were planned to be released on Opel, but they were pulled, apparently by Pink Floyd.

Title
The album is named after "Shine On You Crazy Diamond", a composition by Pink Floyd about and dedicated to Barrett, who led the band during its earlier years.

Track listing 
All songs written by Syd Barrett, except where noted.

Disc 1 – The Madcap Laughs 
 "Terrapin" – 5:04
 "No Good Trying" – 3:26
 "Love You" – 2:30
 "No Man's Land" – 3:03
 "Dark Globe" – 2:02
 "Here I Go" – 3:11
 "Octopus" – 3:47
 "Golden Hair" (Syd Barrett/James Joyce) – 1:59
 "Long Gone" – 2:50
 "She Took a Long Cold Look" – 1:55
 "Feel" – 2:17
 "If It's in You" – 2:26
 "Late Night" – 3:11
 "Octopus" (Takes 1 & 2) – 3:09
 "It's No Good Trying" (Take 5) – 6:22
 "Love You" (Take 1) – 2:28
 "Love You" (Take 3) – 2:11
 "She Took a Long Cold Look at Me" (Take 4) – 2:44
 "Golden Hair" (Take 5) (Barrett/Joyce) – 2:28
 Tracks 14–19: Bonus tracks

Disc 2 – Barrett 
 "Baby Lemonade" – 4:11
 "Love Song" – 3:05
 "Dominoes" – 4:09
 "It Is Obvious" – 3:00
 "Rats" – 3:02
 "Maisie" – 2:51
 "Gigolo Aunt" – 5:47
 "Waving My Arms in the Air" – 2:07
 "I Never Lied to You" – 1:52
 "Wined and Dined" – 2:59
 "Wolfpack" – 3:41
 "Effervescing Elephant" – 1:54
 "Baby Lemonade" (Take 1) – 3:46
 "Waving My Arms in the Air" (Take 1) – 2:13
 "I Never Lied to You" (Take 1) – 1:48
 "Love Song" (Take 1) – 2:32
 "Dominoes" (Take 1) – 0:40
 "Dominoes" (Take 2) – 2:36
 "It Is Obvious" (Take 2) – 3:51
 Tracks 13–19: Bonus tracks

Disc 3 – Opel 
 "Opel" – 6:26
 "Clowns and Jugglers" (Original version of Octopus) – 3:27
 "Rats" – 3:12
 "Golden Hair"  (Barrett/Joyce) – 1:44
 "Dolly Rocker" – 3:01
 "Word Song" – 3:19
 "Wined and Dined" – 3:03
 "Swan Lee (Silas Lang)" – 3:13
 "Birdie Hop" – 2:30
 "Let's Split" – 2:23
 "Lanky (Part One)" – 5:32
 "Wouldn't You Miss Me (Dark Globe)" – 3:00
 "Milky Way" – 3:07
 "Golden Hair" (Instrumental version)  – 1:56
 "Gigolo Aunt" (Take 9) – 4:02
 "It Is Obvious" (Take 3) – 3:44
 "It Is Obvious" (Take 5) – 3:06
 "Clowns and Jugglers" (Take 1) – 3:33
 "Late Night" (Take 2) – 3:19
 "Effervescing Elephant" (Take 2) – 1:28
Tracks 15–20: Bonus tracks

Tracks not included in this collection that were later officially released
 "Bob Dylan Blues" – 3:14
 As seen on The Best of Syd Barrett: Wouldn't You Miss Me? (2001) and An Introduction to Syd Barrett (2010).
 "Matilda Mother" (Alternate version) – 3:14
As seen on An Introduction to Syd Barrett (2010).
 "Rhamadan" – 20:09
As seen on An Introduction to Syd Barrett (2010) and The Madcap Laughs 2015 Japanese reissue. 
 All 8 tracks from The Radio One Sessions (2004).

Personnel 
 Syd Barrett – acoustic guitar, electric Guitar, vocals, producer
 Tim Chacksfield – project coordinator
 David Gilmour – producer
 Brian Hogg – liner notes, compilation, mixing, compilation supervisor, remix supervision
 Peter Jenner – producer
 Malcolm Jones – producer
 Alan Rogers – illustrations
 Phil Smee – compilation, mixing, package design, compilation supervisor, remix supervision
 Roger Waters – producer
 Rick Wright – producer, keyboards and vocal for "Golden Hair (Take 5)"

References 

Syd Barrett albums
Albums produced by David Gilmour
Albums produced by Richard Wright (musician)
1993 compilation albums
Harvest Records compilation albums
EMI Records compilation albums